Johan Allan Edwall (25 August 1924 – 7 February 1997) was a Swedish actor, director, author, composer and singer, best-known outside Sweden for the small roles he played in some of Ingmar Bergman's films, such as Fanny and Alexander (1982). He found his largest audience in the Scandinavian countries for playing lovable characters in several of the film and TV adaptations of the children's stories by Astrid Lindgren. He attended Stockholm's Royal Dramatic Training Academy from 1949 to 1952. During his long career he appeared in over 400 works. At the 10th Guldbagge Awards in 1974, he won the award for Best Actor for his role in Emil and the Piglet.

His 1984 film Åke and His World was entered into the 14th Moscow International Film Festival.

In his self-written songs, he frequently attacked the injustices of society. The music is similar to folk music often using violin and accordion. He won a Swedish Grammy posthumously in 2006.

Edwall also owned a theatre, Teater Brunnsgatan Fyra in Stockholm, which he bought in 1986 and operated until his death in 1997 of prostate cancer (it is now managed by Kristina Lugn’s daughter Martina Montelius). He was the father of photographer Mattias Edwall and stage director, actor and musician Måns Edwall (1960–2016). Acting colleague Erland Josephson wrote about him in Expressen after his death: "He was odd. But, damn it, he managed to be odd in a universal way!"

Partial filmography

 Resan till dej (1953) - Composer (uncredited)
 Our Father and the Gypsy (1954) - Natan
 Dans på rosor (1954) - Olsson, journalist (uncredited)
 Wild Birds (1955) - Fiorentino
 Girls Without Rooms (1956) - Ulla's Husband (uncredited)
 No Tomorrow (1957) - Poet
 Körkarlen (1958) - Tramp
 Raggare! (1959) - Narrator (voice)
 The Virgin Spring (1960) - Beggar
 The Die Is Cast (1960) - Dag Serén
 Heart's Desire (1960) - Servant
 The Wedding Day (1960) - Vicar
 The Devil's Eye (1960) - The ear demon
 On a Bench in a Park (1960) - Man at Restaurant
 Lovely Is the Summer Night (1961) - Luffaren
 Briggen Tre Liljor (1961) - Simon Toking
 Kort är sommaren (1962) - Doctor
 Winter Light (1963) - Algot Frövik
 All These Women (1964) - Jillker
 4x4 (1965) - Banvakten (segment "Uppehåll i myrlandet")
 My Home Is Copacabana (1965) - Narrator (voice)
 Festivitetssalongen (1965) - Lund - Doctor
 Träfracken (1966) - Falk
 Här har du ditt liv (1966) - August
 Mördaren - en helt vanlig person (1967) - Wilhelmsson
 Människor möts och ljuv musik uppstår i hjärtat (1967) - Narrator (voice)
 Eriksson (1969) - Eriksson - Verkstadsarbetare
 Bokhandlaren som slutade bada (1969) - Jacob
 We Are All Demons (1969) - Tor, den syke matrosen
 Ministern (1970) - Lindbaum
 The Emigrants (1971) - Danjel
 Emil i Lönneberga (1971) - Anton - Emils pappa
 The New Land (1972) - Danjel
 Nya hyss av Emil i Lönneberga (1972) - Anton - Emils pappa
 Emil och griseknoen (1973) - Anton
 Elvis! Elvis! (1976) - Elvis' Grandfather
 Games of Love and Loneliness (1977) - Markel
 Måndagarna med Fanny (1977) - Driver
 The Brothers Lionheart (1977) - Mattias
 To Be a Millionaire (1980) - Kansliråd Allan Persson
 Sverige åt svenskarna (1980) - Doctor Karl Otto
 Madicken på Junibacken (1980) - Herr Nilsson
 SOPOR (1981) - Thorbjörn Fälldin
 Tuppen (1981) - Thorsson, receptionist
 Rasmus på luffen (1981) - Oskar
 Fanny and Alexander (1982) - Oscar Ekdahl - Ekdahlska huset
 Limpan (1983) - Sture Charles 'Limpan' Lindberg
 P & B (1983) - Josef 'Stavros' Bendel
 Åke and His World (1984) - Principal Godeman
 Ronia, the Robber's Daughter (1984) - Skalle-Per
 The Sacrifice (1986) - Otto
 Mälarpirater (1987) - Frans i Flinta
 Resan till Melonia (1989) - Prospero (voice)

Discography
1979: Grovdoppa
1981: Färdknäpp
1982: Gnällspik
1982: Ramsor om dom och oss
1984: Vetahuteri
1991: Edwalls blandning
2002: Den lilla bäcken - Allans bästa (posthumous)
2005: Aftonro (posthumous)
2005: Alla Allans visor (posthumous)
2005: Allans allra bästa (posthumous)

Bibliography 
Protokoll (1954, novel)
Ljuva läge (1967, novel)
Engeln (1974, novel)
Limpan (1977, novel)
Mellan liv och död (1993, plays)

Notes

References

External links

1924 births
1997 deaths
Deaths from prostate cancer
Deaths from cancer in Sweden
Eugene O'Neill Award winners
Swedish theatre directors
Swedish male writers
Swedish composers
Swedish male composers
20th-century Swedish male singers
Best Actor Guldbagge Award winners
20th-century Swedish male actors
20th-century classical musicians
20th-century composers